Allan Miller is an American stage, film,  and television actor.

Biography
Miller was born in Brooklyn, New York, the son of Anna (née Diamond) and Benedict Miller. He served in the U.S. Army after World War II during the occupation of Japan. Noticing an ad in Stars and Stripes that was looking for performers, he began performing in shows to entertain the troops. 

In 1948, after Miller returned to the U.S., he attended Erwin Piscator's Dramatic Workshop at The New School for Social Research in New York. He then studied acting under Uta Hagen (his classmates included Geraldine Page and Charles Nelson Reilly); and under Lee Strasberg at the Actors Studio (his classmates included James Dean, Marilyn Monroe, and Paul Newman). In 1958, under Strasberg's sponsorship, he began teaching at the Dramatic Workshop. In 1960, he started teaching privately; one of his students was a teenaged Barbra Streisand.

He is best known for his appearances on television, including Kojak, The Rockford Files, The Streets of San Francisco, Hawaii Five-O,  Wonder Woman, Dallas, and The Paper Chase. His film career included roles in Baby Blue Marine (1976), Two-Minute Warning (1976), Fun with Dick and Jane (1977), Star Trek III: The Search for Spock (1984) and Brewster's Millions (1985). He has performed on stages across the country and on Broadway. He was producing director of the Back Alley Theatre, which he created and ran with his wife, Laura Zucker, from 1979 to 1989.

He is the author of the book, A Passion for Acting, and a DVD, Auditioning. He wrote the play, The Fox, based on the D.H. Lawrence novella, which was produced in Los Angeles, Off-Broadway at the Roundabout Theatre in New York City, and continues to be produced in the United States and around the world.

Personal life
Miller has been married twice. His first wife was actress Anita Cooper, now deceased. He remarried, to Laura Zucker, who for 25 years was executive director of the Los Angeles County Arts Commission.

Filmography
Baby Blue Marine (1976) - Capt. Bittman
Two-Minute Warning (1976) - Mr. Green
Victory at Entebbe (1976) - Nathan Haroun
Fun with Dick and Jane (1977) - Loan Company Manager
MacArthur (1977) - Colonel Diller
Hawaii Five-O (1977) "Shake Hands with the Man on the Moon" - Frank Devlin
The Champ (1979) - Whitey
Cruising (1980) - Chief of Detectives
Star Trek III: The Search for Spock (1984) - Alien
Brewster's Millions (1985) - Political Newscaster
Blacke's Magic (1986) "Wax Poetic" - Donald Rush
Warlock (1989) - Detective
Second Chances (1998) - Dr. Rasmussen
Bad Words (2013) - Bald Glasses Judge

References

External links

Allan Miller Official Site
Allan Miller at the University of Wisconsin's Actors Studio audio collection

Living people
Male actors from New York City
American male film actors
American male television actors
People from Brooklyn
20th-century American male actors
21st-century American male actors
American acting coaches
Year of birth missing (living people)